Kunissery is a village in the Palakkad district of Kerala state, South India. The closest towns are Alathur (about 7 km away) and Kollengode (about 10 km). Kunissery is at Alathur - Kollengode main road. Kunissery has two temples where two different goddesses are worshipped. Kunissery's famous festival is Kumatti which is celebrated on the birthday of the local goddess, Pookulathi Amma, on the Punartham star of Meena Masam (as per Hindu calendar). It is a quaint and simple village where farming is still one of the main source of income for many of the households.

References 

Villages in Palakkad district